Glaucocharis tibetensis is a moth in the family Crambidae. It was described by Wang and Sung in 1983. It is found in China (Tibet).

References

Diptychophorini
Moths described in 1983